Lake Sülüklü, for "Lake of the Leeches", is a freshwater landslide lake located at Tavşansuyu village of Mudurnu district in Bolu Province, Turkey. It is situated in the same-named Nature Park. It is most easily reached from the village of Dokurcun in Akyazı district of Sakarya Province.

References

Landslide-dammed lakes
Suluklu  (Bolu)
Nature parks in Turkey
Landforms of Bolu Province
Mudurnu District